Abdul Nasar Ma'dani, also known as Abdunnasir Ma'dani or Mahdani (born 18 January 1966), is a controversial person, Islamic cleric, and the leader of Peoples Democratic Party (PDP) from Kerala, India.

Mahdani was accused of involving in 1998 Coimbatore bombings, but was acquitted of all charges after spending nine and half years in Coimbatore Central Prison. He is currently under judicial custody at Karnataka in relation with the 2008 Bangalore serial blasts.

Personal life
Ma'dani was born at Anvarserry, Mynagappally, Kollam district to Abdul Samad and Asma Beevi on 18 January 1966. He is married to Soofiya Ma'dani and the couple has three children; a daughter named Shameera and two sons named Umar Mukhthar and Salaludin Ayoobi. Umar Mukhthar is married to Nihammat a native of Thalassery.

His wife Soofiya Ma'dani was the tenth accused in 2005 Kalamassery bus burning case.

He lost his right leg on 6 August 1992 following a bombing attack near Anwarserry and is using Prosthetic leg since then.

Political Activism and allies
At a young age, Mahdani began delivering sermons at a local mosque in the Kollam district. His oratory skills were well received, and he soon built up a following. He subsequently formed the Islamic Seva Sangh (ISS) in 1989. This organization was banned following Demolition of the Babri Masjid. In 1992 he launched a new outfit named Peoples Democratic Party (India) calling for Muslim - Dalit movement.

Though he was jailed since 1998, in 2001 Kerala Legislative Assembly election his outfit backed the United Democratic Front and in 2006 Kerala Legislative Assembly election his party backed Left Democratic Front. He and his political outfit was in alliance with Communist Party of India (Marxist) for 2009 Indian general elections. He is still the chairman of Peoples Democratic Party.

Chengara Solidarity March
Abdul Nasser Mahdani delivered a speech at Chengara Adivasi Protest in support of the struggle in May 2008. He declared the objective of Muslim-Dalit-Adivasi Unity under the banner of "Power to Avarnas and Liberation to The Oppressed

Incarceration and release

1998 Arrests and release
Ma'dani was arrested by Kerala Police under the leadership of Jacob Thomas IPS on March 31, 1998 from residence at Kaloor in connection with 1998 Coimbatore bombings. He was initially shifted to Kozhikode and then to Tamil Nadu. He was released on August 1, 2007 after acquittal in this case.

Free Ma'dani Campaigns 
In March 16, 2006 Kerala Legislative Assembly passed a unanimous resolution seeking release of Ma'dani on humanitarian grounds from Coimbatore Central Prison in connection with 1998 blasts.

His political outfit Peoples Democratic Party and politicians like K. T. Jaleel has also voiced for release of Ma'dani.

With the aim of providing legal and financial aid to PDP chairman Abdul Nasser Ma'dani, who has been arrested in connection with the Bangalore blast case, to wage legal and political battle, Justice For Ma'dani Forum was constituted under the aegis of various Muslim organisations on 25 August 2010. The Justice for Ma'dani Forum demanded that the Bangalore blast case, in which PDP leader Abdul Nasser Ma'dani, has been listed as an accused, should be probed by any agency outside the state of Karnataka, preferably by the National Investigation Agency.

There are a section of society who claims that Ma'dani is unlawfully kept in undertrial for long and is framed.

2010 arrest 
Ma'dani was arrested by a join team of Karnataka Police and Kerala Police from his residence at Kollam district on August 17, 2010. He was lodged in Central Prison, Bangalore after the arrests.

Bails after 2010 arrest 
In March 2013 Mahdani was granted a 5-day interim bail to attend his daughter's wedding and to visit his ailing father. In 2013 bail he has made controversial remarks during speech at daughter's wedding. On 21 October 2013, the Supreme Court of India directed the Karnataka Government to immediately shift Mahdani to a private hospital for treatment. The court also allowed his wife to be along with him as a bystander during his stay in the hospital. In November 2014 Government of Karnataka submitted that the enquiries for trial will be completed in six months.

On 24 July 2017, his bail application for attending his son's marriage on 9 August was initially rejected by NIA court. In response to this, his party PDP called for statewide Hartal in Kerala on 26 July 2017. Later Supreme Court of India granted him 7 day bail from Aug 7 - August 14 to attend his son's wedding at Thalassery.

In 2018 October he was granted bail for visiting his ailing mother. In 2021 Supreme Court rejected his plea for further relaxations in 2014 bail conditions.

Controversies

Islamic Seva Sangh 
Mahdani had set up the Islamic Seva Sangh in 1989. It was banned in 1992 for alleged subversive act along with SIMI and Jamaat-e-Islami following the Babri Masjid demolition.

Hate Speeches 
There were numerous cases against him charged by Kerala Police for making inflammatory speeches and issuing vitriolic communal statements post Babri Masjid demolition.There is nearly 24 cases charged against him in Kerala.

Alleged involvement in Coimbatore blast case 

He was allegedly involved in the 1998 Coimbatore bombings held on 14 February 1998, that killed 58 people. Mahdani was imprisoned for nine years in this case in Tamil Nadu. Later, Mahdani was acquitted of all charge.

Alleged involvement in Bangalore Blasts

Connections with Thadiyantavide Nazeer 
Investigators allege that suspected south India commander of the Lashkar-e-Taiba Thadiyantavide Nazeer came into militancy through ISS founded by Mahdani. Nazeer is suspected to have established links with LeT and was picked up by Bangladeshi authorities and handed over to BSF on the Meghalaya border. In connection with the Bangalore blast case, police have presented phone records to the court proving that Ma'dani contacted the main accused Nazeer several times before and after the blast. Phone calls were made from a number registered in Ma'dani's wife Soofiya's name.

According to the police, after orchestrating the blasts Nasir went in hiding at Ma'dani's office at Anvarssery. However Ma'dani's advocate B. V. Acharya has contended that it is "only a make believe theory to implicate Ma'dani". Nazeer has also confessed that he has coordinated the 2005 Kalamassery bus burning case for release of Ma'dani from Coimbatore jail.

High Court and Supreme court observations in Bangalore blast case
Ma'dani is lodged in Karnataka jail and is in judicial custody for his involvement in the 2008 Bangalore serial blasts, which killed one person and injured 20 more, and for similar incidents in Ahmedabad, Surat and Jaipur. As per former Karnataka state Home Minister V. S. Acharya, Mahdani also allegedly admitted role in the 2010 Bangalore stadium bombing on 17 April 2010, which he had denied earlier. This assertion regarding the confession of Mahdani was rejected by Mahdani's counsel and said that the allegation baseless and devoid of facts, and is politically motivated. After a court issued a fresh non-bailable warrant, Mahdani claimed that he proffered to surrender so as to avoid 'unpleasant situations' when he was to be arrested.

On 11 February 2011, the Karnataka High Court had rejected Mahdani's plea stating that there is no direct evidence of conspiracies against Ma'dani. At the final hearing Justice Markandey Katju uttered that he was wondering as to how a person on a wheel chair could pose a threat if released on bail.The Supreme Court bench was divided on granting bail to Mahdani and posted the matter to Chief Justice of India to form a new bench to decide on the plea. However, in 2013 -14 court relaxed bail conditions and Ma'dani was granted bail on personal grounds by courts multiple times between 2013 and 2018. In 2020 Chief Justice of India Sharad Arvind Bobde called him a dangerous man on a plea for further relaxation in bail conditions.

Murder attempt case 
Madhani has been named the first accused in a case registered in 2013 relating to the alleged attempt in 1998 to murder RSS ideologue P. Parameswaran and Father K. K. Alavi, a convert into Christianity from Islam. The case relates to Ma'dani offering money to murder both individuals. Ma'dani dismissed the charges and said he was not involved in it and alleged political conspiracy against him. In September 2015, Crime Branch had submitted to the court that Parameswaran and Alavi had stated that they had never faced any attempt on their life as alleged in the complaint and that no evidence could be obtained to substantiate this allegation against Mahdani.

Allegations of appeasement and position of agencies. 
Government of Karnataka strongly contends that Ma'dani is involved in conspiracy related to 2008 Bangalore serial blasts and the prime accused Thadiyantavide Nazeer is mentored by him. In October 2018 Rajeev Chandrasekhar and various Hindutva organisations alleged that politicians of Kerala has resorted to appeasement by passing resolution in favor of Ma'dani's release in 2006.

See also 

 1998 Coimbatore bombings
 2008 Bangalore serial blasts
 Terrorism in India

References

External links
Maudani's Official Website Maudani's Official Website 

Coimbatore blast case Deccan Herald – 5 January 2005
Afzal mercy as national discourse _ a national shame Newindpress – 27 December 2006

Living people
Malayali people
Indian Muslims
Indian prisoners and detainees
Year of birth missing (living people)
Politicians from Kollam district